Westminster City Council, the local authority of the City of Westminster in London, England, is elected every four years. Since the last boundary changes in 2002, 60 councillors have been elected from 20 wards. New boundary changes will come into effect for the 2022 elections, when the borough will be represented by 54 councillors in 18 three-member wards.

Political control
From the first elections to the council in 1964 until 2022, overall political control of the council was held by the Conservatives, with Labour gaining control in 2022:

Leadership
The role of Lord Mayor of Westminster is largely ceremonial, with political leadership instead being provided by the leader of the council. The leaders since 1964 have been:

Council elections
1964 Westminster City Council election
1968 Westminster City Council election (boundary changes took place, but the number of seats remained the same)
1971 Westminster City Council election
1974 Westminster City Council election
1978 Westminster City Council election (boundary changes took place, but the number of seats remained the same)
1982 Westminster City Council election
1986 Westminster City Council election
1990 Westminster City Council election
1994 Westminster City Council election (boundary changes took place, but the number of seats remained the same)
1998 Westminster City Council election
2002 Westminster City Council election (boundary changes took place, but the number of seats remained the same) 
2006 Westminster City Council election
2010 Westminster City Council election
2014 Westminster City Council election
2018 Westminster City Council election
2022 Westminster City Council election

Borough result maps

By-election results

1964–1968

1968–1971

1971–1974

1974–1978
There were no by-elections.

1971–1982
There were no by-elections.

1982–1986

The by-election was called following the resignation of Michael B. Forsyth.

The by-election was called following the resignation of Francis Maude.

The by-election was called following the death of Jean Merriton.

1986–1990

The by-election was called following the resignation of Peter J. Hartley.

The by-election was called following the resignation of Rachel E. Whittaker.

The by-election was called following the resignation of Patricia M. Kirwan.

1990–1994

The by-election was called following the resignation of Barry C. Legg.

The by-election was called following the resignation of Shirley Porter.

The by-election was called following the resignation of Joseph Glickman.

The by-election was called following the death of Hugh G. Garside.

1994–1998

The by-election was called following the resignation of Peter C. S. Bradley.

The by-election was called following the resignation of Karen P. Buck. 

The by-election was called following the resignation of Andrew H. Dismore.

1998–2002

The by-election was called following the resignation of Nicola Russell.

The by-election was called following the resignation of Richard A. Stirling-Gibb.

The by-election was called following the resignation of Ron M. Harley.

The by-election was called following the resignations of  Jillian A. Selbourne and Gary P. Martin.

The by-election was called following the resignation of Jonathan S. Djanogly.

2002–2006

The by-election was called following the resignation of Josephine S. Ohene-Djan.

2006–2010

The by-election was called following the death of Kevin A. Gardner.

The by-election was called following the resignation of Michael G. Vearncombe.

The by-election was called following the death of Antony G. Mothersdale.

The by-election was called following the resignation of Simon H. Milton.

The by-election was called following the death of Ian G. Wilder.

The by-election was called following the death of Mushtaq A. Qureshi.

2010–2014

The by-election was called following the resignation of Colin Barrow.

The by-election was called following the resignation of Harvey C. J. Marshall.

2014–2018

The by-election was called following the resignation of Edward J. C. Argar.

The by-election was called following the resignation of Nilavra Mukerji.

The by-election was called following the death of Audrey R. Lewis.

The by-election was called following the resignation of Vincenzo Rampulla.

2018–2022

The by-election was called following the resignation of Robert J. Davis.

The by-election was called following the resignation of Andrea Mann.

Notes

References

External links
City of Westminster Council
By-election results

Council elections in Greater London
Council elections
Council
Elections